
Gmina Wola Krzysztoporska is a rural gmina (administrative district) in Piotrków County, Łódź Voivodeship, in central Poland.

Villages
Gmina Wola Krzysztoporska contains the villages and settlements of Blizin, Bogdanów, Bogdanów-Kolonia, Borowa, Budków, Bujny, Dąbrówka, Gąski, Glina, Gomulin, Gomulin-Kolonia, Jeżów, Kacprów, Kamienna, Kargał-Las, Kozierogi, Krężna, Krężna-Kolonia, Krzyżanów, Laski, Ludwików, Majków Duży, Mąkolice, Mąkolice-Kolonia, Miłaków, Moników, Mzurki, Oprzężów, Oprzężów-Kolonia, Parzniewice Duże, Parzniewice Małe, Parzniewiczki, Pawłów Dolny, Pawłów Górny, Piaski, Piekarki, Piekary, Poraj, Praca, Radziątków, Rokszyce, Rokszyce Szkolne, Siomki, Stradzew, Wola Krzysztoporska, Wola Rokszycka, Woźniki, Woźniki-Kolonia, Wygoda and Żachta.

Neighbouring gminas
Gmina Wola Krzysztoporska is bordered by the city of Piotrków Trybunalski and by the gminas of Bełchatów, Drużbice, Grabica, Kamieńsk and Rozprza.

References
 Polish official population figures 2006

Wola Krzysztoporska
Piotrków County